Böckler Park (German: Böcklerpark) is a park in Kreuzberg, Berlin, Germany.

References

External links
 

Friedrichshain-Kreuzberg
Parks in Berlin